Ivan Georgiev may refer to: 

Ivan Georgiev (musician)
Ivan Georgiev (footballer)
Ivan Georgiev, Bulgarian trap shooter; see Selin Ali

See also
 Ivana Georgieva (born 1971), Bulgarian fencer